The London Fire and Emergency Planning Authority (LFEPA) was a functional body of the Greater London Authority (GLA), established under the Greater London Authority Act 1999. Its principal purpose was to run the London Fire Brigade. The 17 members of LFEPA were appointed annually by the Mayor of London. Eight were nominated from the London Assembly, seven from the London boroughs and two were Mayoral appointees. It replaced the London Fire and Civil Defence Authority, on 3 July 2000.

Under the Policing and Crime Act 2017, LFEPA was abolished in April 2018 and replaced with the London Fire Commissioner, a new governance arrangement within the Greater London Authority.

Members
Members for 2016/17 were as follows:

The current chair is Dr Fiona Twycross, who was appointed by Mayor of London Sadiq Khan in May 2016.

Controversy
In June 2007 the Labour Mayor, Ken Livingstone, refused to re-appoint all but one of the Conservative and Liberal Democrat LFEPA members on the grounds that "the nominations failed to tackle the under representation of women and Black, Asian and ethnic Londoners on the authority." The Evening Standard reported that the mayor's political opponents were likely to seek a High Court injunction to reverse the decision. A compromise was eventually reached whereby the Mayor replaced one of the male Conservative London Assembly Members, Bob Blackman, with Angie Bray and appointed the London Councils' nominations on a temporary basis until August. These appointments were extended to June 2008.

References

External links
LFEPA
Babcock International wins contracts with LFEPA for maintenance of vehicles and equipment 
 
 https://www.telegraph.co.uk/news/uknews/1375233/I-was-the-victim-of-a-racist-witch-hunt-says-fireman.html
 http://www.metro.co.uk/news/331005-firefighter-s-years-of-race-hate-abuse

Local government in London
Emergency management in the United Kingdom
Greater London Authority functional bodies
2000 establishments in England
Government agencies established in 2000
Major precepting authorities in England